Cyrtodactylus stellatus is a species of gecko, a lizard in the family Gekkonidae. The species is endemic to Ko Tarutao, Thailand.

References

Cyrtodactylus
Reptiles described in 2021
Reptiles of Thailand